St Bedes Inter-Church School (formerly St Bedes Inter-Church Comprehensive School) is the only Christian state secondary school in Cambridgeshire. It is an academy school with support from both the Roman Catholic Diocese of East Anglia and Anglican Diocese of Ely. The school currently has around 750 pupils and around 50 staff.

History 
St Bede's opened in 1962 as a small Roman Catholic secondary school housed in one central building, under the leadership of headmaster K.G. Kent and around 18 nuns teaching and running the school. Over the years, the school began to admit students from other Christian denominations, notably the Anglican Church. In the light of the increasing ecumenical co-operation between the Roman Catholic and Anglican churches the school was closed, re-opening in 1988 as a joint Catholic/Anglican foundation, St Bedes Inter-Church Comprehensive School, retaining most of the original staff, including the nuns, but with a new management. Gradually, the nuns disappeared, the last two leaving the school in 2001.

Since then the school has expanded and additional buildings have been added; first a technology block, housing Food Technology, Textiles Technology and Design Technology, although now also hosts Information Technology; then the St Etheldreda block, a suite of 12 general-purpose classrooms (the "B Block") in 1995. Three science laboratories were refurbished in 2001; in 2003, four new English classrooms, a purpose built drama and dance studio and purpose built music rooms were added and in 2005 a state of the art Sports Hall including teaching rooms and tennis courts brought the school to its present state. Due to the increasing popularity and expansion of the school the site continued to need mobile classrooms to cope with the demand for teaching space. The latest £4m development began in August 2008, aiming to replace all mobile classrooms with six teaching rooms, two new art rooms and a digital media centre, a chaplaincy and more refurbished science labs. These include the latest developments such as geothermal heating and wireless internet access. The new Art and Chaplaincy building has been connected to the technology and English/music/drama building to create one large building which can be walked through when raining; covered walkways will be added between the main block and "B" block, the only building which now stands alone.

In 2004 the school had its last full OFSTED inspection, and was designated as mainly satisfactory, but served with notice to improve subjects such as music and food technology.

The school gained Humanities Specialist Status in September 2005 with History as the lead subject and Geography/Religious Education in support. This has meant increased funding for those departments, providing them with two extra teachers and new resources. In 2009 the school was invited to apply for a second specialism in light of the school's success in the Humanities department. The choice was Maths & Computing: the Maths department had previously been nominated as a consultant Maths department.

The school's 2007 OFSTED inspection judged it to be "a good school with outstanding features". RE, Resistant Materials and ICT were noted to have lower achievement than other subjects in the school. After the inspection, Resistant Materials lost its status as an independent subject and, in 2008, new heads of department were appointed for RE and ICT.

In 2011, the school was re-inspected by OFSTED and designated as Outstanding in all areas except behaviour and overall quality of teaching, which it was advised to improve.

The school converted to academy status in August 2012.

Expansion 
The school is receiving a major expansion after a fire burned the technology block. The school is expanding to accommodate 900 students with 3 science classrooms being added on top of the original gym, a new tiered-seating assembly hall and an expansion to the over capacity canteen.

While the technology block was being renovated the school rented 3 mobile classrooms to temporarily replace the classrooms. Many computers were lost in the fire, including expensive electrical equipment.

References 

Secondary schools in Cambridgeshire
Catholic secondary schools in the Diocese of East Anglia
Church of England secondary schools in the Diocese of Ely
Academies in Cambridgeshire